The 2019–20 season is Ferro Carril Oeste's 18th consecutive season in the second division of Argentine football, Primera B Nacional.

The season generally covers the period from 1 July 2019 to 30 June 2020.

Review

Pre-season
Rodrigo Melo's departure to Estudiantes (BA) was confirmed on 11 June 2019. 18 June saw Guido Milán join from Veracruz. Three days later, midfielder Rodrigo Brandán was loaned out to Sacachispas. A third player left on 24 June, as Franco Lazzaroni made a move across the division to Gimnasia y Esgrima. Cain Fara was signed by Primera División outfit Aldosivi on 24 June. Walter Busse announced, on 26 June, that he was to leave the club at the conclusion of his contract, days later, due to personal reasons. Gabriel Díaz joined Patronato of the Primera División on 29 June. However, Ferro claimed that a deal was still being discussed and Díaz had been offered a new contract. Numerous loans from the previous campaign officially expired on and around 30 June.

Ferro revealed, on 1 July, that Gabriel Díaz had indeed put pen to paper on a new contract, though would be loaned to Patronato for the 2019–20 season. Leonel Álvarez, after signing a new deal, was moved out on loan to Flandria on 1 July. Gustavo Canto was captured on loan from Dorados de Sinaloa of Ascenso MX on 4 July. Leonardo Landriel and Augusto Vantomme terminated their contracts on 5 July, subsequently joining Los Andes and Acassuso. Tomás Asprea, after his previous loan deal expired on 30 June, returned to Ferro on a second temporary contract from Comunicaciones on 5 July. Ferro met Huracán in their opening friendlies on 6 July, with the top-flight club ending the day undefeated. Pablo Ortega penned terms from Central Córdoba on 8 July.

On 10 July, having renewed their respective contracts, Matías Ramírez and Cristian Carrizo were loaned out to Villa Dálmine. Ferro beat Aldosivi in pre-season matches on 10 July. Ferro suffered losses in friendlies with San Lorenzo on 18 July. Ferro couldn't secure a friendly victory over Almagro on 20 July, falling to a draw and a defeat on home soil. Ferro recorded a win and a tie with Tristán Suárez in exhibitions on 24 July. Days later, encounters with Comunicaciones were cancelled due to bad weather. 31 July saw Ferro reach an agreement for Carlos Carbonero. Soon after, Ferro revealed a new contract was offered to Enzo Díaz; who was to answer in the succeeding days. They beat Defensores de Belgrano by two before losing by a goal on 2 August in pre-season.

Also on 2 August, Gastón Ada terminated his contract with Ferro - subsequently joining Chilean second tier team Deportes Valdivia on 4 August. 2 August also saw Pablo Medina sign for Justo José de Urquiza on loan. On 6 August, Ferro announced that Enzo Díaz had rejected their contract offer - with the club subsequently accepting a $325,000 offer from Tigre. Ferro were scheduled to face Banfield on 9 August, but the fixture was scrapped due to the poor climate. Carlos Carbonero's transfer from Deportivo Cali was officially completed on 9 August. Arriving from Mexico's Coras de Nayarit, Lucas Pugh penned contract terms on 15 August.

August
Ferro were beaten by two goals at home to Platense in Primera B Nacional on 19 August, as Andrés Bailo conceded twice in as many minutes in the second half. Ferro lost a five-goal thriller to Independiente Rivadavia on 25 August, despite a late goal from debutant Franco Pulicastro.

September
Ferro's poor form continued into September, as they succumbed to a 0–2 loss at the Estadio Arquitecto Ricardo Etcheverry to Atlanta. Ferro stopped the rot on 8 September, as they secured their first point of the campaign at home to Mitre. However, on 13 September, they returned to losing ways with a defeat to Estudiantes (RC).

Squad

Transfers
Domestic transfer windows:3 July 2019 to 24 September 201920 January 2020 to 19 February 2020.

Transfers in

Transfers out

Loans in

Loans out

Friendlies

Pre-season
Ferro Carril Oeste, on 17 June 2019, revealed an exhibition fixture with Huracán, with it set for 6 July. A further friendly with Tristán Suárez was tentatively scheduled for 20 July on 28 June. On 1 July, a match with Aldosivi of the Primera División was set. Almagro scheduled an encounter with Ferro for 20 July, the same date as the Tristán Suárez game. Ferro announced friendlies with San Lorenzo and Comunicaciones on 12 July, as well as the rescheduling of the Tristán Suárez fixture. They'd also play Defensores de Belgrano and Banfield in early August.

Competitions

Primera B Nacional

Results summary

Matches
The fixtures for the 2019–20 league season were announced on 1 August 2019, with a new format of split zones being introduced. Ferro Carril Oeste were drawn in Zone A.

Squad statistics

Appearances and goals

Statistics accurate as of 14 September 2019.

Goalscorers

Notes

References

Ferro Carril Oeste seasons
Ferro Carril Oeste